The 1953–54 season was Colchester United's twelfth season in their history and their fourth season in the Third Division South, the third tier of English football. Alongside competing in the Third Division South, the club also participated in the FA Cup. Colchester were knocked out in the first round of the cup by Millwall following a replay. The club struggled in the league for the second successive season, eventually finishing 23rd of 24 teams under new manager Jack Butler. The club had to apply for re-election at the end of the season for the first of three occasions in its history. All four clubs applying for re-election were successful, with Colchester receiving 45 votes, behind Chester by three votes but ahead of both Walsall (32 votes) and Halifax Town (28 votes).

Season overview
Following Jimmy Allen's resignation at the end of the previous season, the Colchester United board shortlisted three names for the vacant managerial position, and in-line with their cost reduction policy, appointed Ron Meades as player-manager. Meades had claimed to have been with Cardiff City, and more recently manager of Western League side Wadebridge Town. Journalist Arthur Wood investigated Meades' background and revealed that Meades was a fraud, and after just four days in charge, Meades was asked to leave by the club.

Colchester hurriedly appointed a new manager, Jack Butler, a former player for Arsenal and England international. He had coached in Belgium, initially with Royal Daring Club Molenbeek and had been in charge of the Belgium national team between 1935 and 1940, leading them to the 1938 World Cup finals. More recently, he had managed Torquay United and Crystal Palace, but Butler had little time to prepare his side ahead of the new season, and a 13-game winless run in late 1953 saw Colchester slump to 23rd position in the league.

With the crowd average falling season-on-season to 7,797, the club were required to apply for re-election after finishing the campaign ten points adrift of safety. Colchester earned 45 votes, enough to ensure another season in the Football League, but having been prolific goalscorers earlier in their history, the club had scored only 50 league goals this season.

Players

Transfers

In

 Total spending:  ~ £2,500

Out

Match details

Third Division South

Results round by round

League table

Matches

FA Cup

Squad statistics

Appearances and goals

|-
!colspan="14"|Players who appeared for Colchester who left during the season

|}

Goalscorers

Clean sheets
Number of games goalkeepers kept a clean sheet.

Player debuts
Players making their first-team Colchester United debut in a fully competitive match.

See also
List of Colchester United F.C. seasons

References

General
Books

Websites

Specific

1953-54
English football clubs 1953–54 season